"Gotta Go" (lit. "Already 12 o'clock") is a song recorded by South Korean singer Chungha. It was released as a single on January 2, 2019, by MNH Entertainment and distributed by Genie Music, and was promoted as a single album. Adopting a darker style, the princess concept appears to be a shift away from the "girl crush" image of her previous albums Hands on Me and Offset.

Background and release
Chungha unveiled three teaser photos and two music video teasers for the song before its release. "Gotta Go" was released digitally and physically on January 2, 2019; the physical edition is a single album titled XII. The song was also released as a separate digital single through several music portals, including iTunes.

Composition
"Gotta Go" moves Chungha into a more sultry place than her past singles with its vibrant flute sounds and squelching synths acting as a backdrop to her rich vocals. Chungha mentioned she had always wanted to do a concept like this. Though “Gotta Go” shows a new and different side of Chung Ha, it also marks her return to collaborating with Black Eyed Pilseung and Jeon Goon, the team behind her 2018 hit "Roller Coaster." The song's Korean title literally translates to "Already Midnight". In an interview with Billboard, Chungha elaborated on the song's musical direction by saying:

Reception
"Gotta Go" peaked at number two on the Gaon Digital Chart, number one on the Billboard K-Pop Hot 100 and number six on the World Digital Song Sales chart, becoming her most successful single to date and her first top 10 entry on the latter. It was the second most-downloaded, eighth most-streamed and overall the eighth best performing song of 2019 in South Korea. It also reached the charts in New Zealand and Singapore. The single also brought Chungha her first music program trophy at MBC Music's Show Champion on January 9 and went on to receive 7 total wins. As of June 2022, it has over 90 million views on YouTube and 108 million streams on Spotify.

Music video
The music video is less girlish than her prior ones, replacing the aforementioned sparkles and glitter with mature, bolder looks, such as power shoulders and a smokey eye and lip hues. Choreography-wise, things similarly shift away from the past, with the emphasis being on theatrical elements like hand moves emulating a clock striking midnight and intense footwork.

Accolades

Track listing
CD / digital download
"벌써 12시 (Gotta Go)" – 3:41

Chart performance

Weekly charts

Year-end charts

Sales and certifications

See also
 List of Inkigayo Chart winners (2019)
 List of Kpop Hot 100 number ones
 List of M Countdown Chart winners (2019)

References

2019 singles
2019 songs
Chungha songs
Billboard Korea K-Pop number-one singles
MNH Entertainment singles
Korean-language songs